Mark Mullins may refer to:

Mark Mullins (economist) (born 1961), former executive director of the Fraser Institute
Mark Mullins (hurler), retired Irish hurler
Mark Mullins (politician), Progressive Conservative Party of Ontario candidate
Mark Mullins (musician), New Orleans trombone player of Bonerama and Galactic

See also
Mark Mullen (born 1961), American journalist
Markwayne Mullin (born 1977), American politician from Oklahoma